Council for the Future of Europe is a think tank, established in September 2011, initiated and supported by the Nicolas Berggruen Institute as one of its projects, in its manifesto calling for a political union of Europe: 

It aims to:

External links
 Future of Europe Mission Statement | Nicolas Berggruen Institute, at berggruen.org, Europe is the Solution, Not the Problem, by Council for the Future of Europe / Nicolas Berggruen Institute, 6 September 2011
 Statement by the Council for the Future of Europe: Europe is the Solution, Not the Problem, by Council for the Future of Europe / Nicolas Berggruen Institute, 5 September 2011 (PDF)

Think tanks established in 2011
Political and economic think tanks based in Europe